Max Hell Frog Warrior also known as Toad Warrior is a 1996 martial arts sci fi cult film written, produced, and directed by Donald G. Jackson and Scott Shaw. This film is the third in the Hell Comes to Frogtown series, following the cult films Hell Comes to Frogtown and Return to Frogtown. Initially developed under the title Toad Warrior, the film gained its current title for its 2002 release. The story was co-conceived by Donald G. Jackson, creator of the Frogtown franchise. The film stars Scott Shaw, Joe Estevez, Conrad Brooks, and Jill Kelly.

Plot
The Earth is being swept by a toad plague. Enter, the lone Samurai, Max Hell, the Earth's last hope to save the planet from the mad clutches of Mickey O'Malley.

"Shaw stars as Max Hell in this no-budget mess that doesn’t really have much to do with earlier Frogtown movies.  He uses a samurai sword and seems irresistible to women. The plot involves some renegade scientist about to detonate a bomb that’ll turn everyone into toads."

This film follows the lead character, Max Hell, played by Scott Shaw, who goes on a mission to rescue Dr. Trixi T from the clutches of the evil Mickey O'Malley, played by Joe Estevez.  According to Donald G. Jackson, Max Hell Frog Warrior is not so much a sequel as it is a standalone film inspired by the original concept for Hell Comes to Frogtown.

Zen Filmmaking
This film is considered a Zen Film in that it was created in the distinct style of filmmaking formulated by Scott Shaw known as Zen Filmmaking.  In this style of filmmaking no scripts are used; instead a rough plot is outlined including the basic scenes and locations and then the crew and actors improvise the rest, all dialogue and action is spontaneous and entire plot points, scenes and setpieces are formulated on the spot. Shaw and Jackson have claimed the technique offers freedom of creativity allowing for very natural performances from actors and a unique artistic outcome.

Versions
 An early cut  (under the name Toad Warrior) received an unofficial release from distributors who obtained a master copy of the film.
 A filmmaker-approved version appeared in 2002 under the name Max Hell Frog Warrior.
 A third version, truncated to 30 minutes, was assembled by Scott Shaw and released as Max Hell in Frogtown: A Zen Speed Flick.
 A fourth version, re-envisioned in the style of 1920s silent films was released as Max Hell The Frog Warrior: A Zen Silent Flick.

Connections
 Rollergator (1996)  - Conrad Brooks's Swamp Farmer and Rollergator both make appearances in Max Hell Frog Warrior.

References

External links
 Max Hell Frog Warrior Official Website
 
 
 

1996 films
1990s action films
1990s science fiction films
American sequel films
1990s English-language films
Films directed by Donald G. Jackson
Films directed by Scott Shaw